Kaldarreh-ye Sofla (also Romanized as Kaldarreh-ye Soflá and Kaldarrehsoflá) is a village in Reza Mahalleh Rural District, in the Central District of Rudsar County, Gilan Province, Iran. At the 2006 census, its population was 304, in 100 families.

References 

Populated places in Rudsar County